Gmelina hainanensis is a species of tree in the family Lamiaceae. It is found in southern China (Hainan Island, and the mainland provinces Guangdong, Guangxi as well as southern Jiangxi) and in Vietnam.

Gmelina hainanensis provides fine timber. It is threatened by logging and habitat loss. It is under Class II National Protection in China.

References

hainanensis
Trees of China
Trees of Vietnam
Vulnerable plants
Taxonomy articles created by Polbot